Richard Wurtman (March 9, 1936 – December 13, 2022) was an American neuroscientist who spent his career doing basic and translational neuroscience research at Massachusetts Institute of Technology.

Early life and education
Richard Wurtman earned his undergraduate degree at University of Pennsylvania and then went to Harvard Medical School, where he earned his MD in 1960. He did a two year residency at Massachusetts General Hospital, and then joined Julius Axelrod's lab at the National Institutes of Health, which was pioneering studies of neurotransmitters and the ways that drugs affect them.

Career
In 1967 Massachusetts Institute of Technology invited him to open a lab to continue the NIH work in the Department of Nutrition and Food Science, which was the only department doing in vivo work at the time.  In the 1980s MIT formed a new department of Brain and Cognitive Sciences, which pulled together people working on psychology, neuroscience, and neuroscience, and Wurtman joined it.

In 1994 he was appointed the first Cecil H. Green Distinguished Professor at MIT, and by that time was also a Professor of Neuroscience in MIT’s Department of Brain & Cognitive Sciences, and a Professor of Neuropharmacology in the Harvard–MIT Division of Health Sciences & Technology.

Wurtman retired in 2011, and by that time he had published around 1,000 papers and trained around 300 students and post-docs.

Notable findings
Much of Wurtman's work at MIT involved discovering a new function of an existing biomolecule, like a hormone or neurotransmitter, figuring out how that discovery might be useful in medicine, and then trying to use that biomolecule as a drug itself, or using an existing drug to affect its function, a strategy called drug repurposing. His early affiliation with people in nutrition and food science also led him to consider ways that food and nutrient affect health.

Wurtman was involved in the evaluations of aspartame when it was first being introduced as an artificial sweetener; he initially testified on behalf of its manufacturer that it was safe, but subsequent research led him to call, in 1983, for further testing due to his concerns that consuming large amounts (not small amounts) could be harmful.

In 1994 his lab published work showing that melatonin is a hormone, secreted at night-time, needed for the induction & maintenance of normal sleep.

Along with Nicholas Zervas of Beth Israel Hospital and Harvard Medical School, another early area of Wurtman's research pertained to the neurotransmitter dopamine, and its role in stroke physiology.  Wurtman's studies occurred at a time of significant growth in research and understanding of neurotransmitters, with optimistic expectations for practical outcomes.

In the 2000s his lab started exploring food components that could help maintain or improve the health of the brain, focusing on choline, uridine, and the omega-3 fatty acid DHA; this work became incorporated into the medical food product, Souvenaid.

Serotoninergic synapses are thus a useful target for drugs to treat obesity and other conditions which affect appetite and mood (e.g. premenstrual syndrome; seasonal depression).   The patent for using fluoxetine to treat premenstrual dysphoric disorder was licensed to Wurtman's startup, Interneuron, which in turn sold them to Lilly. This became the product marketed as Sarafem.

Commercial activities
Wurtman co-founded Interneuron Pharmaceuticals in 1988, which was renamed to Indevus in 2002. Indevus brought an in-licensed product, Trospium chloride, to market before being acquired by Endo Pharmaceuticals in 2009 for $370 million in cash and $267 million in milestones.

Wurtman's patent on using dexfenfluramine, an isomer of fenfluramine, to suppress appetite was also licensed to Interneuron, which licensed the patents to Wyeth; this drug was withdrawn from the market in 1997 after "Phen-fen" was found to be harmful.

Wurtman also founded Back Bay Scientific, Inc. along with his wife and daughter; the company sells dietary supplements.

Publications
Among Wurtman's publications are the following:

References

1936 births
2022 deaths
Massachusetts Institute of Technology School of Science faculty
Harvard University faculty
American neuroscientists
American pharmacologists
University of Pennsylvania alumni
Harvard Medical School alumni
Scientists from Philadelphia